Caminho das Índias (lit: Path to the Indies; English title: India: A Love Story) is a Brazilian telenovela produced by TV Globo. It ran from 19 January to 11 September 2009. Caminho das Índias is a story of contrasts which examines the differences in beliefs and values of the Eastern and Western world.

The telenovela stars Juliana Paes, Rodrigo Lombardi, Letícia Sabatella, Tânia Khallil, Débora Bloch, Alexandre Borges and Bruno Gagliasso.

Overview

The title can be interpreted in two ways: it is Portuguese for "Route to the Indies" (literally) or "India's Way" (figuratively). The story is set during India's transition into a modern democracy, mostly in the period of the 1990s to 2000s, with many prominent flashbacks to the 1950s and 1970s. The story is equally divided between continents, from Rio de Janeiro, Brazil, to Rajasthan, India, with some scenes in Dubai. Themes include love, reason, sanity, insanity, and tradition versus modernity. The story highlights the contrasts of values and belief systems in the West and the East, told through families, their friends, and the complex mesh of relationships which connect them.

Plot

One of the main plot points is a forbidden love between castes. Maya, a charming call-centre employee in Rajasthan, comes from the Vaishya trader caste.  While her parents try to arrange a marriage for her, she falls in love with Bahuan, which she declares to her parents. She does not understand Bahuan's misgivings until learning that he is the orphaned son of Dalit (untouchable) servants who were burned at the stake for accidentally touching their master's shadow. They plan a future together while her parents arrange a marriage to Raj Ananda, and Bahuan works toward his career, eventually becoming a partner in a Brazilian company.

Meanwhile, Raj falls in love with Brazilian Duda, who initially fights for Raj's affections but the cultural conflicts exhaust and disillusion her, and she turns away from Raj for a new love.  Ravi then falls in love with a Brazilian woman, Camilla. As she tries to adapt to Hindu culture, she provokes conflict in the Ananda family of tradespeople, as Raj's younger sister Shanti aspires to become educated and eschews the traditional roles for women favoured by her mother. Ravi and Camilla eventually marry.

Production

Locations
Artistic and general director Marcos Schechtman and director Fred Mayrink traveled to India to write the telenovela's first scenes, which began filming on 1 October 2008 in the cities of Jaipur and Agra. In addition to 40 people from the Brazilian team, the telenovela had partnered with a local producer. The modern architecture of Dubai, in the United Arab Emirates, also served as filming locations for the show at the end of October.

Sets and art direction
In order to recreate the environment for the story, three-city sets were constructed at Projac in Rio de Janeiro, totalling . One of these sets imitates the typical architecture of the Lapa neighborhood in Rio de Janeiro, Brazil, while the other two attempt to recreate features of the Indian state of Rajasthan.

Using the cities of Jaipur, Jodhpur and Mumbai as references, the art director built 42 shops and a temple of Shiva, in addition to the street façade for a movie theater, and terracota-colored households of the four main Indian families of the story. One of the margins of the Ganges was also reproduced, through an artificial lake built near the entrance of the studio complex.

The art production team, led by Mario Monteiro, attempted to reproduce an Indian universe on camera. The Indian core of the telenovela received a very colorful ambiance, with Hindi inscriptions, in comparison to the clean aesthetics of the Brazilian scenarios. The sets were dressed with Indian items which were purchased or reproduced, and vehicles used in India were built by the team to fill the street of the artificial city.

The wardrobe was also carefully studied by Emilia Duncan. Women's traditional clothes, such as the sari were recreated, although with a bit of poetic license, thus bringing some clothing usually used in rituals for the everyday wearing.

Cast

Invited Actresses

Soundtrack

Caminho das Índias vol. 1, National 
Cover: Juliana Paes

 Beedi Jalaile – Sukhwinder Singh & Sunidhi Chauhan (opening theme)
 Eu Nasci Há Dez Mil Anos Atrás – Nando Reis (India's location theme)
 Pára-Raio – Skank (Murilo's theme)
 Uma Prova De Amor – Zeca Pagodinho (Castanho and Suellen's theme)
 Vamos Fugir (Gimme Your Love) – Gilberto Gil (Tarso and Tônia's theme)
 Ela Disse – Marcelo D2 (Júlia's theme)
 Memórias – Pitty (Inês theme)
 Martelo Bigorna – Lenine (Yvone's theme)
 Nada Por Mim – Paula Toller (Camila's theme)
 Alma – Zélia Duncan (Melissa and Ramiro's theme)
 Sob Medida – Isabella Taviani
 Lembra De Mim – Emílio Santiago (Sílvia's theme)
 Amor, Meu Grande Amor – Ângela Rô Rô (Chiara and Murilo's theme)
 Não Se Esqueça De Mim – Nana Caymmi & Erasmo Carlos (Maya and Bahuan's theme)
 Feliz – Gonzaguinha (Raj and Duda's theme)
 O Vento Vai Responder (Blowin' in the Wind) – Zé Ramalho (Dayse's theme)
 Dois pra lá, dois pra cá – Elis Regina (Rio de Janeiro's location theme)
 Até Quem Sabe – Nara Leão (Raul's theme)
 Sufoco da Vida – Harmonia Enlouquece
 Você Não Vale Nada – Calcinha Preta (Norminha's theme)

Caminho das Índias vol. 2, Indian
 Beedi Jalaile – Sunidhi Chauhan, Sukhwinder Singh, Nachiketa Chakraborty and Clinton Cerejo (opening theme)
 Kajra Re – Alisha Chinai, Shankar Mahadevan and Javed Ali
 Nagada Nagada – Sonu Nigam and Javed Ali
 Sajna Ve Sajna – Sunidhi Chauhan
 Main Vari Vari – Kavita Krishnamurti and Reena Bhardwaj (theme of Maya and Bahuan)
 Mast Kalandar – Sunidhi Chauhan
 Chori Chori Hum Gori Se – Abhijeet and Udit Narayan
 Salaam-E-Ishq – Sonu Nigam and Shreya Ghoshal
 Salaam – Alka Yagnik
 Azeem-O-Shaan Shahenshah – Mohammed Aslam, Javed Akhtar and Bonnie Chakraborty
 Bangra Jaya – Alexandre de Faria

Caminho das Índias vol. 3, Lapa
Cover: Juliana Alves

 Eu vou pra Lapa – Alcione
 Malandro é malandro, mané é mané  – Diogo Nogueira (theme of César and Ilana)
 Só faltou você Lado a Lado B – Leandro Sapucahy
 Vaso Ruim – Casuarina (theme of Radesh)
 Tristeza Pé no Chão – Teresa Cristina & Grupo Semente
 Amor de verdade – Beth Carvalho
 Errei – Sururu na Roda (live)
 Pretinha Jóia Rara – Moyseis Marques
 Em Desfile Chatos – Jota Canalha
 Sal e Pimenta – Gabriel o Pensador
 Puro êxtase – Barão Vermelho
 Anjo da madrugada – Babi Xavier (theme of Duda and Lucas)
 Lourinha Bombril (Parate y mira) – Bangalafumenga
 Legal, Vou ficar – Quatro Fatos
 Põe aê uma música – DJ Alex Guedes
 Uma flor uma raiz – Fino
 Coletivo Mezcla – Riosalsa (theme of Suellen and Ademi)

Caminho das Índias vol. 4, International
 Halo – Beyoncé Knowles (theme of Yvone)
 Thinking of You – Katy Perry (theme of Bahuan and Shivani)
 Orishas – Público
 Never Gonna Be Alone – Nickelback (theme of Tônia and Tarso)
 Tip of My Tongue – Something Sally feat. Joss Stone (theme of Aída and Darío)
 Small Talk – Ovi
 To Love you All Over Again – Madeleine Peyroux (theme of Chiara)
 Sober – Pink
 Use Somebody – Kings Of Leon
 Lies – McFly (theme of Zeca)
 Madly – Tristan Prettyman (theme of Duda and Lucas)
 Quando e se – Ari Hest (theme of Silvia and Murilo)
 Lay Lady Lay – Dan (theme of Dr. Castanho and Suellen)
 I'm in the Mood for Love – Daniel Boaventura (theme of Maya and Raj)
 All the Way – Ronaldo Canto e Mello (theme of Camila and Ravi)
 Smoke Gets in Your Eyes – Oséas (theme of Shankar y Laksm)

Caminho das Índias vol. 5, Instrumental
 Os portais do Taj Mahal – Alexandre de Faria (General theme)
 Tema de Maya e Bahuan – Alexandre de Faria (theme of Maya and Bahuan)
 Quase um Intocável – Alexandre de Faria (Untouchable's theme)
 Caminho das Índias – Alexandre de Faria (theme of general dance)
 Nos passos de Shankar – Alexandre de Faria (theme of Shankar)
 Meu Salaam – Alexandre de Faria (romantic theme)
 Meditação e Karma – Alexandre de Faria (incidental theme)
 Re Tchori – Alexandre de Faria (theme of general dance)
 Habanera para Tarso – Alexandre de Faria  (theme of Tarso)
 Maxixe Chorado – Alexandre de Faria (theme of Lapa neighborhood)
 Uma Canção sem Palavras – Alexandre de Faria (tema triste)
 Tango da Ausência – Alexandre de Faria (theme of Lapa neighborhood)
 Berceuse pour un Nuit – Alexandre de Faria (incidental theme)
 Toda Levada – Alexandre de Faria

Awards

In November 2009, Caminho das Índias was recognized as Best Telenovela in the 2009 International Emmy Awards.
In Brazil, it won four awards for Best Telenovela.

The cast won several awards.  
Bruno Gagliasso won five awards for Best Supporting Actor.
Dira Paes won four awards for Best Supporting Actress.
Rodrigo Lombardi won two awards for Best Actor.
Juliana Paes won one award for Best Actress.

See also
Brazil–India relations
Caste system in India
Culture of India
Indian soap opera
Masala chai
TV Globo

References

External links

Caminho das Índias (Official Website) (in Portuguese)
 Official international trailer
 Telenovela-World Bilingual Forum

 
2009 telenovelas
2009 Brazilian television series debuts
2009 Brazilian television series endings
Brazilian telenovelas
TV Globo telenovelas
Brazil–India relations
International Emmy Award for Best Telenovela
Portuguese-language telenovelas
Telenovelas by Glória Perez
Television shows set in Rajasthan
Television shows set in Rio de Janeiro (city)